The Grove Christmas Tree is an approximately 100-foot Christmas tree that is lit every year at The Grove at Farmer's Market in Los Angeles, California. In 2002, it was the tallest Christmas tree in the Los Angeles area and attracted about 90,000 visitors a day during the holiday season.

History
The tradition of lighting The Grove Christmas Tree takes place in mid-November after it was begun in 2002 by real estate developer and businessman Rick J. Caruso. He aimed to make the tree the centerpiece of his retail and entertainment complex, The Grove in Los Angeles, during the Christmas season. In time, the popularity of the annual lighting ceremony eventually rivaled that of the famed Rockefeller Center Christmas Tree lighting mid-town Manhattan, New York. The Grove Christmas Tree measures 100 to 110 feet while the Rockefeller Center tree is only about 75 to 90 feet.

The first white fir tree used for the event was harvested from the Mount Shasta region in Northern California in 2010. The following year, a 100-foot white fir was decorated with more than 10,000 lights and 15,000 ornaments, setting the precedent for successive Christmas trees for The Grove at Farmers Market.

Tree Lighting
Among the performers who have graced the event are operatic acts Il Divo and Jackie Evancho, pop singers The Backstreet Boys, Michael Bolton, Far East Movement, Colbie Caillat, Sean Kingston, Gavin DeGraw, and Robin Thicke as well as American Idol alumni Lauren Alaina, Scotty McCreery, and Phillip Phillips. Caruso’s Top Hats Dancers Rachel Montez Collins and Kathryn Burns have also showcased their famous act. Actor and celebrity insider Mario Lopez hosts the annual celebration.

For the 10th anniversary of the Christmas tree lighting, The Grove partnered with the Make-A-Wish Foundation for its “Season of Wishes” campaign. Christmas lights and baubles covered the white fir tree as well as everything else at The Grove.  The evening showcased artificial snowfall, bubbles, and a fireworks finale.

KCBS-TV, the Los Angeles area affiliate (and West Coast flagship station) of CBS, televises The Grove Christmas Tree lighting live every year. It is syndicated to hundreds of television stations across the United States, including most of the CBS network's owned-and-operated stations and other affiliates as well.

See also
Rockefeller Center Christmas Tree
Rich's Great Tree
National Christmas Tree
California Capitol Christmas Tree
Hollywood Christmas Parade
 Capitol Christmas Tree
 White House Christmas tree
 Vatican Christmas Tree

References

External links
The Grove at Farmer's Market
Make-A-Wish Foundation of Greater Los Angeles' Season of Wishes campaign

Individual Christmas trees
Culture of Hollywood, Los Angeles
Tourist attractions in Los Angeles
Fairfax, Los Angeles
Christmas in California
Individual trees in California